John "Joe" Ashley (10 June 1931 – 24 August 2008) was an English footballer who played as a goalkeeper.

Career
Born in Clowne, Derbyshire, Ashley joined York City from Frickley Colliery in October 1950. He made nine league appearances for the club and left during that season.

References

1931 births
2008 deaths
People from Clowne
Footballers from Derbyshire
English footballers
Association football goalkeepers
Frickley Athletic F.C. players
York City F.C. players
English Football League players